Linostoma may refer to:
 Linostoma (plant), a genus of plants in the family Thymelaeaceae
 Linostoma, a genus of beetles in the family Chrysomelidae, synonym of Platyphora
 Linostoma, a genus of protists in the family Condylostomatidae, synonym of Linostomella
 Linostoma, a genus of fungi in the family Ophiostomataceae, synonym of Ophiostoma